"It's Cow or Never" is the eighth episode and first season finale of the American superhero television series Peacemaker, a spin-off from the 2021 film The Suicide Squad. The episode was written and directed by series creator James Gunn. It originally aired on HBO Max on February 17, 2022.

The series is set after the events of The Suicide Squad, and follows Christopher Smith / Peacemaker. Smith returns to his home but is forced to work with A.R.G.U.S. agents on a classified operation only known as "Project Butterfly". Smith also has to deal with his personal demons, including feeling haunted by memories of people he killed for "peace". In the episode, the team takes a last stand in order to stop the Butterflies from transporting their main supply. 

The episode received critical acclaim, with critics praising Gunn's directing, writing, performances, emotional tone, action sequences, soundtrack, character development and surprises.

Plot
With the threat level of the Butterflies, Adebayo contacts Waller to ask for a back-up team, such as the Justice League. Waller informs her that it is very unlikely they can get there in time.

As the team arrives outside the farm, they settle on having Eagly carry a detonator. Smith hands Eagly his sonic boom helmet, but Eagly drops it away from the farm. Smith tries to find the helmet, but is taunted by a hallucination of Auggie. Harcourt witnesses the "encounter", seeing Smith arguing alone. They eventually find the helmet, but realize they must place it themselves inside the farm. Economos is chosen to infiltrate the farm and place the helmet, as he is the only one that wasn't seen by the Butterflies.

Economos freely walks through the farm and descends to the farm's underground base. He is horrified to see the cow and leaves, leaving the helmet inside. As he is leaving, a Butterfly discovers his identity and the Butterflies chase him. Adebayo activates the helmet, leading to many explosions in the farm. Smith, Chase and Harcourt then enter the field and kill most of the Butterflies. Seeing that Song is descending to the cow, Smith follows her while Harcourt and Chase continue the fight, but both are critically wounded in the fight. Economos also injures himself, forcing Adebayo to enter the field and kill Butterflies, also preventing one from possessing Harcourt. Donning Smith's "human torpedo" helmet, Adebayo joins Smith in the underground base.

After Adebayo fails to properly use the helmet, Song decides to spare Smith and show him the cow. She wants him to help them with their plan in transporting the cow. She explains that the Butterflies moved to Earth from their dying planet, intending to survive with the cow. The Butterflies eventually concluded that humanity would also go extinct, preferring to prioritize profit over their survival. She wants him to join them, but Smith instead activates the human torpedo helmet once again, launching Adebayo into the cow and killing it. Smith kills Locke and Song, but spares the Goff Butterfly. He and Adebayo meet with Chase, Harcourt and Economos outside. The Justice League finally arrives, only to be told by an angry Smith that they arrived too late.

Harcourt, Chase and Economos are admitted into the hospital for their injuries. In the waiting room, Smith questions whether he made the right choice by having the cow killed but is comforted by Adebayo, their friendship amended. Adebayo then holds a press conference, clearing Smith and Chase and exposing Project Butterfly, Task Force X, and Waller herself. Adebayo reunites with her wife Keeya, Harcourt begins physical therapy to recover from her injuries, and Economos returns to work at Belle Reve. Judomaster discovers the massacre at the farm and cries. Back at his home trailer, Smith feeds the Goff Butterfly with the last of the amber fluid. In another hallucination, he is joined by Auggie in the entrance.

Production

Development
The episode originally served as a series finale, due to the "miniseries" status of the series. Jennifer Holland explained that series creator James Gunn approached the season as a complete story, without knowing for certain if there would be a second season. The day before the airing, HBO Max announced that the series would be renewed for a second season.

Writing
On the decision to have Smith kill Sophie despite evidence of the Butterflies that their planet is heading to perdition, Gunn said that he viewed the moment as letting go of the person that his father made him to be. He further explained "I see Peacemaker as being ignorant of scientific and cultural issues. I don't think he has a lot of ideals about politics. I think he has just followed the crowd he's been with. But in other ways, he is laudable because he isn't a racist. He doesn't subscribe to what his father subscribes to, or what he believes with his own sexuality, with the type of music he listens to, and I don’t think he puts a lot of faith in his father's belief system. He just wants his father’s love. The butterfly is talking about people that just don't really pay attention; you follow, and you read a meme on Facebook and believe it's true, because that meme says that masks hurt us. It's a ludicrous thing to believe, and it makes no sense whatsoever, but they believe it because they read a meme."

Many endings were considered for the episode. One of these included Smith joining the Butterflies, but Gunn discarded the idea, stating "it's a choice between the lives of these people he's come to love and this choice to stick with his old way of doing things." Gunn didn't intend for Emilia Harcourt and Adrian Chase to die in the episode, explaining "I think it just seems like the better story overall for me."

Questioned on Judomaster's true alliance, Gunn said that the character has no friends or allies in the series. One of the goals for the episode included having it clear that he had a bigger role in the future, stating "He's revealed that he does have good intentions at the end. We see him sad at the end. He does care about something. He's not just an evil little jerk. He's just a little jerk."

Casting

The episode featured an uncredited cameo appearance of Jason Momoa and Ezra Miller, both reprising their roles as Arthur Curry / Aquaman and Barry Allen / The Flash from the DC Extended Universe, while Superman and Wonder Woman were portrayed by stand-ins. Gunn was initially worried that Smith's comments of Aquaman having sex with fishes would upset Momoa, but Momoa found it funny and agreed to appear in the episode. Miller's participation was also possible, as they liked Gunn's films and agreed to appear when they were asked. Miller's scene was filmed on the set of Guardians of the Galaxy Vol. 3, which was allowed by Marvel Studios as a favor to Gunn, who had Chukwudi Iwuji's screen test for the film filmed from the set of Peacemaker. Gunn described the moment as "It was done through pure force of will on my part, of really pushing it to happen. I think everybody read it in the script, agreed to it, and then it became a thing, and they realized what a big fucking deal it was."

While Gunn was often questioned during the season for some jokes where Smith insulted other characters, the studio didn't oppose most of the content in the finale, explaining, "They were pretty open to whatever, and they knew what the nature of Peacemaker was and who he is. We can't go into this and have Peacemaker spouting a bunch of bullshit about politics and women and not have him spouting bullshit about characters in the DCEU." Despite the support, the original cut included stand-in actors for Batman and Cyborg, which were removed by Gunn on petition of the studio. Gunn explained that the scenes might have been removed as the studio has bigger plans for the characters in the future.

The episode also featured an uncredited cameo appearance by Viola Davis as Amanda Waller, similar to her cameo appearance in "A Whole New Whirled". Similarly to her previous appearance, the crew traveled to Los Angeles to film her scene.

Filming
While the episode was the eighth to air, it was actually the sixth to be filmed. Generally, the episodes took 12-15 days to film. In contrast, the episode required night shoots that had to delay filming for proper lightning, taking 21-22 days to film.

Music
The farm attack included the song "Do Ya Wanna Taste It" by Wig Wam, which is also used in the opening credits of the episodes. According to Gunn, the song "kind of leads to that moment". He also further draw meaning to the lyrics "Do you want to taste it", with "Do you want to deal with this shit from these three badasses?". He further added, "it all leads up to Harcourt getting wounded and choking on her own blood."

Reception

Critical reviews
The first seven episodes of the series were sent out in screeners to television critics. While HBO Max wanted to send the eighth episode as well, Gunn convinced them to not send it for surprise factors, stating "There's just too many things happening in episode eight that I just could not let it get out there."

"It's Cow or Never" received critical acclaim. Samantha Nelson of IGN gave the episode an "amazing" 9 out of 10 rating and wrote in her verdict, "Peacemaker successfully brings its first season to a close with an emotional, heartfelt, and hilarious finale. There's less action than some may prefer, and the major cameo was more spectacle than substance, but this first chapter of our ride with Chris Smith was given a delightfully meaningful ending that leaves us hyped for the already announced Season 2."

Jarrod Jones of The A.V. Club gave the episode an "A-" grade and wrote, "Peacemaker is and has always been about personal growth —for Chris, for Leota, for us. 'Did I just kill the world?' Peacemaker asks Leota. “Maybe,” she says, 'or maybe you just gave us a chance to make our own choices instead of our bug overlords.' For the first time in both their lives, they have control over what happens next. It's a good feeling to find your inner strength, but it's important to understand that it's a fleeting thing. Maybe that's why Auggie Smith pops up in Chris' head for that final shot; it's Gunn’s personal coda, and a reminder that even though you're always striving to better yourself, there's always room for improvement. You're always going to struggle with your demons." 

Alan Sepinwall of Rolling Stone wrote, "So what did we learn from the Peacemaker finale, kids? Well, we learned that a human torpedo is ultimately more powerful than a kaiju that provides milk for a race of butterfly aliens. We learned that Peacemaker is perhaps less of a garbage person than he once seemed. And we learned that maybe, just maybe, Peacemaker wasn't lying about Aquaman fucking fish? Or maybe we just learned that Peacemaker creator James Gunn can now get away with anything in the realm of comic-book movies and TV shows." Brian Lowry of CNN wrote, "At times, Peacemaker felt like it was trying too hard to be irreverent, but that reflects Gunn's creative sensibility, while sending a message to talent about what's possible in the world of streaming - including dragging Aquaman into your show, just for fun." 

Rafael Motamayor of Observer wrote, "Peacemaker is a more adult effort than Guardians of the Galaxy, which plays to Gunn's visceral and irreverent sensibilities, and also longer and more character-focused than The Suicide Squad. The result may just be the best superhero story James Gunn has ever told. Thankfully HBO Max has announced a second season, because when it comes to more Peacemaker episodes, I really do wanna taste it." Miles Surrey of The Ringer wrote, "The first season of James Gunn's DC series was funny and expertly staged, but most impressively, it added layer after layer to its titular hero." James White of Empire gave the season a 4 star rating out of 5 and wrote, "Gunn scores a bullseye with this series, blending vulgarity, heart and sheer insanity for a winning, killer combo – not to mention, an unskippable opening-credits sequence that you'll never grow tired of watching."

Alec Bojalad of Den of Geek gave the episode a perfect 5 star rating out of 5 and wrote, "Peacemaker asks a very compelling question in its first episode. Now, after this wonderful finale, I think it's fair to say that the answer to that question is an emphatic yes, yes we do want to taste it." Roxy Simons of Newsweek wrote, "Peacemaker came to a thrilling conclusion on Thursday, February 17 with an action-packed final stand and some huge DC cameos."

Accolades
TVLine named Steve Agee as the "Performer of the Week" for the week of February 19, 2022, for his performance in the episode. The site wrote, "Filed under We Were Not Expecting This was the way that this season's running and incredibly juvenile 'Dye Beard' put-down came full circle in a surprising way, leading to a helluva performance by Steve Agee."

References

External links
 

Peacemaker (TV series) episodes
2022 American television episodes
Television episodes directed by James Gunn
Television episodes written by James Gunn